Khaas ( is a 2019 Pakistani television series, produced by Momina Duraid under their banner MD Productions and directed by Danish Nawaz. It stars Sanam Baloch and Ali Rehman Khan in leading roles with a supporting cast of Haroon Shahid, Hira Tareen, Behroze Sabzwari, Lubna Aslam, Sajida Syed, Saba Faisal, Natasha Ali and Anam Goher. Baloch has made her acting comeback after her last appearance in Teri Raza (2017).

Plot 
The plot revolves around Saba Faraz (Sanam Baloch), an ambitious and confident girl and Ammar Saud (Ali Rehman Khan), a charming and handsome businessman who is actually a narcissist. After Ammar's family sends a marriage proposal for Saba, she is reluctant to get married as she wants to focus on her career after completing her post-graduate studies. However, Ammar adamantly pursues Saba and gets her approval. In the process, Saba falls for Ammar's false charms. It is only after they get married that Ammar's true colours begin to show. He disrespects her and insults her. When she gets a job offer from Ammar's office, he gets jealous of her career and disapproves on her decision of taking the job in the worst way possible. Further in the show it shows Saba's struggle in getting out of the toxic marriage and moving on. After her parents even go against her and are all trapped in Ammar's false charm, she finally marries the man who respects her, Fakhir (Haroon Shahid), but destiny isn't with Saba.

Cast
Sanam Baloch as Saba Faraz
Ali Rehman Khan as Ammar Saud; Saba's first husband
Haroon Shahid as Fakhir; Ammar's friend; Saba's second husband
Behroze Sabzwari as Faraz Ahmed; Saba's father
Lubna Aslam as Sadaf Faraz; Saba's mother
Saba Faisal as Kanwal Saud; Ammar's mother
Mashal Khan as Sonia; Ammar and Nida's cousin
Anam Goher as Nida Saud; Ammar's younger sister
Sajida Syed as Nusrat
Natasha Ali as Farah; Ammar's cousin
Momal Sheikh
Amna Malik as Javeria; Ammar and Fakhir's friend, later Saba's friend
Shehryar Zaidi as Saud; Ammar's father
Sonia Nazir as Anam
Areesha Shah as Mehak Faraz; Saba's younger sister
Sanam Baloch as Fakhir's late mother (only seen in flashbacks)
Danish Nawaz as Fakhir's late father (only seen in flashbacks)
Hira Tareen as Salma; Ammar's second wife

Soundtrack
The official soundtrack of the series is sung by Natasha Baig on the lyrics of Mohammad Akmal and music composition is done by Sohail Haider.

Reception

The serial received critical acclaim due to its subject, storyline and performances of the cast, especially of Baloch and Khan. Sadaf Haider of Dawn Images lauded the writing of the serial and wrote, "Emotional abuse is a slippery subject but TV drama Khaas gets it right so far." Baloch's performance and character received praise from critics with Dawn Images lauded her performance stating, "Sanam Baloch is back in great form as Saba; her performances are rarely anything other than excellent and this is no exception". Critics also praised the performance of Ali Rehman Khan, Hira Tareen and Haroon Shahid. A reviewer from Daily Times said it, "One of the most relatable drama serials" due to its common subject and relatable storyline. Despite positive reviews and critical praise throughout its run, the series received mixed reviews for its "forceful" end.

Accolades

References

External links
Official website

2019 Pakistani television series debuts